Ezhacherry Ramachandran (born 1944) is a Malayalam poet, lyricist and journalist. He has penned lyrics for several Malayalam movies and albums. In 2020, he won the Vayalar Award.

Personal life
Ramachandran was born at Ezhacherry near Pala, Kerala. He studied at S.V.N.S.S High School, Edanad. He was the chief editor of Deshabhimani weekly. He has won the best lyricist award for professional dramas several times. He has also written more than 30 film songs. Chandana Manivathil from the 1988 film Marikkunnilla Njan, composed by Raveendran and sung by G. Venugopal is the most popular among them.

Awards
1995: Kerala State Bala Sahitya Institute Award
2008: Kerala Sahitya Akademi Award for Poetry - Enniloode
2015: Kerala Sahitya Akademi Award for Children's Literature - Sunny Cherukkanum Sangeetha Pengalum
2015: Abu Dhabi Sakthi Award for Poetry - Ilathumbile Vajradaaham
2016: Asan Poetry Prize
2020: Vayalar Award - Oru Virginian Veyilkaalam
2020: I. V. Das Award
Ulloor Award
Moloor Award
A. P. Kalaykkad Award
S. B. T. Award
Nimishakavi Achal R. Velu Pillai Award
Ezhumangalam Vamadevan Award
Pandalam Kerala Varma Award 
M. S. Rudran Award

References

External links

1944 births
Poets from Kerala
People from Kottayam district
Living people
Indian editors
Malayalam poets
Malayalam-language writers
20th-century Indian poets
Recipients of the Kerala Sahitya Akademi Award
Recipients of the Abu Dhabi Sakthi Award